The Canadian Bankers Association (CBA) is a trade association and lobby group representing Canadian banks. Its over 60 members include Canada's Big Five banks, smaller domestic banks, and Canadian subsidiaries of foreign banks.

Founded in Montreal in 1891, the CBA is one of Canada's oldest interest groups. The CBA is headquartered at Commerce Court West in Toronto's Financial District and maintains additional offices in Ottawa and Montreal.

Lobbying activities with the federal government (2012)
According to the Federal lobbyist registry, from January to September 2012, the Canadian Bankers Association had 131 contacts with federal officials to discuss issues such as mortgage insurance, identity theft laws, do-not-call list, corporate income tax, and accounting rules, making it the lobby group with the second most contacts that year.

See also

 Banking in Canada

References

External links
 

Canadian lobbyists
Lobbying in Canada
Lobbying organizations in Canada
Trade associations based in Canada
Political advocacy groups in Canada
1891 establishments in Canada
Banking in Canada
Bankers associations